Kandanos or Kantanos, also Candanos, is a town and former municipality in the Chania regional unit, Crete, Greece. Since the 2011 local government reform it is part of the municipality Kantanos-Selino, of which it is a municipal unit. It was part of the former Selino Province which covered the southwest of the island. The town has 421 residents.

History

Nearby is the site of the ancient town of Cantanus.

The town of Kandanos and its surrounding area suffered particularly badly from German occupation during World War II. During the Battle of Crete, resistance fighters had held advancing German soldiers for two days, preventing them from reaching Palaiochora to secure it. In retribution the occupiers razed the village to the ground and erected a sign: "Here stood Kandanos, destroyed in retribution for the murder of 25 German soldiers, never to be rebuilt again."

The town was rebuilt however, and the sign retained in a war memorial. Several of the Byzantine churches and their frescoes were restored. Germany donated waterworks after the war to the village and former soldiers stationed there returned in reconciliation.

Facilities include a health centre, a police station, a bank, a post-office, a pharmacy, and some shops, taverns and cafes. The municipality also includes 28 villages, like Anisaraki, Koufalotos, Plemeniana, Kadhros, Kakodiki and Floria.

International relations

Kandanos is twinned with:

See also
List of communities of Chania
Lidice, a Czechoslovak village destroyed by Germany during World War II

References

External links

Municipality description
GTP description

Populated places in Chania (regional unit)